Stefaan Sintobin (born 16 January 1960 in Izegem) is a Flemish politician for Vlaams Belang who has been a member of the Flemish Parliament since 2004.

Biography  
Sintobin worked for Blokker Holding before becoming a politician. In 2004, Sintobin was elected as a member of the Flemish Parliament for the Vlaams Belang (VB) party for the West Flanders region. In 2009, he was placed first place of the list for West Flanders after former VB leader Frank Vanhecke resigned his mandate in the Flemish Parliament. He was also re-elected in 2019. In the Flemish Parliament, he has been chairman of the Welfare, Public Health, Family and Poverty Reduction Committee since 2019. He has also served as a city councilor in Bruges since 2019 and was formerly a councilor in his home city of Izegem.

References 

Living people

Members of the Flemish Parliament

1960 births
Vlaams Belang politicians
21st-century Belgian politicians